Alexander Paterson may refer to:

 Alexander Paterson (Australian politician) (1844–1908), independent member of the Australian House of Representatives
 Alexander Paterson (penologist) (1884–1947), British penologist
 Alexander Paterson (bishop) (1766–1831), Roman Catholic bishop in Scotland
 Alexander McDonald Paterson (1871–1953), Canadian politician
 Alex Paterson (born 1959), English musician
 Alexander Nisbet Paterson (1856-1947), Scottish Arts & Crafts architect

See also
 Sandy Paterson (disambiguation)
 Alexander Patterson (1911–1993), Canadian politician